Melker may refer to:

Given name
Melker Garay (born 1966), Swedish author
Melker Hallberg (born 1995), Swedish footballer
Melker Svärd Jacobsson (born 1994), Swedish pole vaulter
Melker Karlsson (born 1990), nicknamed The Melkman, Swedish professional ice hockey winger
Melker Schörling (born 1947), Swedish billionaire businessman

Surname
Daisy de Melker (1886–1932), South African nurse who poisoned two husbands with strychnine for their life insurance money
Nigel Melker (born 1991), Dutch racing driver
Syd de Melker (1884–1953), South African international rugby union player

See also
Melker Sand Formation, geologic formation in Austria
MELCOR
Malkiar
Mel Kerr
Molkar

Swedish masculine given names
de:Melker
nl:Melker